Wetherby School is a group of private schools for boys aged two to eighteen in Notting Hill, London, owned and operated by the Alpha Plus Education Group. Its prep school is a member of the Independent Association of Preparatory Schools.

The school is named after Wetherby Place, in turn named after a West Yorkshire town, Wetherby, and should not be confused with Wetherby High School, a local secondary school.

It has several notable former pupils, including William, Prince of Wales, Prince Harry, Duke of Sussex, and the actor Hugh Grant.

History
Wetherby School was founded in 1951 as a pre-preparatory school for boys aged 4–8.  In 2004 it opened a preparatory department (known as Wetherby Prep, and intended to be a separate school) in a nearby building, allowing boys to stay on until the age of 13. The prep school has since moved to its current location in the City of Westminster.  The pre-preparatory school had, as of 2017, 360 boys on its roll, including 88 in Reception. It has since opened a nursery section ("Little Wetherby") for boys aged 2½ to 4.

The school's original building, in 1951, was in Wetherby Place in South Kensington (hence the name, Wetherby School) but in 1971 it moved to its present building in Pembridge Square, on the other side of Kensington Gardens.  The school building is a white stucco double fronted Victorian house in the Italianate style typical of Notting Hill and Holland Park architecture, constructed in about 1850.  It is on the south side of Pembridge Square, a private garden square with keyholder-only access which the boys use as their playground.

Admissions
Pupils are accepted on a first-come, first-served basis and operates, therefore, no entrance examination, test or interview.  The result is that the school caters for boys of many different abilities and talents.

The fees for the 2019-2020 academic year are £7,710 per term and are increased each year in accordance to, among other factors, the ten year plan set by the Alpha Plus Group for the valuation of its assets. The fees are currently higher than in comparable schools such as Thomas's that charges £7,143 in Kensington and £6,429 in Battersea.

However, because fees are charged (and, to a lesser extent, because of the smart neighbourhood in which it is located), the boys tend to come from a fairly narrow professional family background.  It is also a single-sex school, although it is in the same ownership as Pembridge Hall, a similar school for girls which is also located in Pembridge Square.  There are no formal joint activities between the two schools, but many children in each school have siblings at the other school.

Uniform
The boys wear a uniform of grey shorts, grey blazers with red trim, white shirts and plain red ties; and a grey peaked cap.  The school logo "WS" in red is on the cap and on the breast pocket of the blazer.

Preparatory school

In 2004, Wetherby expanded to open a prep division for boys aged 7 to 13, sited in Bryanston Square, London. In September 2012, Wetherby Prep was awarded 'Prep School of the Year' at the annual Tatler School Awards at the Dorchester Hotel.

The fees for the 2019-2020 academic year are £7825 per term and are increased each year in accordance to, among other factors, the ten year plan set by the Alpha Plus Group for the valuation of its assets.

Senior school

Due to popular demand, Wetherby Senior School for boys aged 11 to 18 opened for its first intake in September 2015. It is located at the former premises of DLD College London on Marylebone Lane, a ten-minute walk away from the prep school.

The fees for the 2019-2020 academic year are £8310 per term and are increased each year in accordance to, among other factors, the ten year plan set by the Alpha Plus Group for the valuation of its assets.

The Senior school continued to generate losses during the 2018/19 academic year and the parent company does not expect that the situation will change until 2021 the earliest.

Wetherby Kensington

Wetherby Kensington is the most recent school to join the Wetherby family, with their doors opening in September 2017. Wetherby Kensington is situated on Wetherby Gardens in Kensington, which is the same street that the original Wetherby School was based back in 1951, and takes boys from Reception – Year 3 (4–8 years old). Helen Milnes, former Deputy Head Pastoral at Wetherby School Notting Hill, is the current Headmistress.

Alumni
Romeo Beckham, professional footballer and son of David and Victoria Beckham
Sir Lawrence Clarke, 7th Baronet, Olympic athlete and financier
Julian Fellowes, Baron Fellowes of West Stafford, actor and writer; Conservative peer of the House of Lords (2011–)
Hugh Grant, actor
Prince Harry, Duke of Sussex, younger son of Diana, Princess of Wales and Charles III
Julian Lloyd Webber, cellist
William, Prince of Wales, elder son of Diana, Princess of Wales and Charles III
Lord Frederick Windsor, son of Prince and Princess Michael of Kent
Prince Constantine Alexios of Greece and Denmark 
Damian Hurley, son of actress Elizabeth Hurley
Archie Campbell, Marquess of Lorne, British aristocrat

References

External links
 School website
 Senior School website
 Pre-Prep and Prep School profiles on the ISC website

Private boys' schools in London
Private schools in the Royal Borough of Kensington and Chelsea
Preparatory schools in London
Private schools in the City of Westminster